The Theban Tomb TT56 is located in Sheikh Abd el-Qurna. It forms part of the Theban Necropolis, situated on the west bank of the Nile opposite Luxor. The tomb is the burial place of the ancient Egyptian official Userhat, who was the Royal Scribe, Child of the Royal Nursery, during the 18th Dynasty king Amenhotep II and his wife Mutnefret. TT56 is one of the best preserved Theban nobility tombs from Western Thebes and its paintings boast many vivid and brightly painted scenes depicting the deceased Userhat and Mutnefret receiving gifts and presents in the afterlife.

See also
 List of Theban tombs
 N. de Garis Davies, Nina and Norman de Garis Davies, Egyptologists

References

External links
 Scans of Norman and Nina De Garis Davies' tracings from Theban Tomb 56 (external).

Buildings and structures completed in the 13th century BC
Theban tombs